Piskent (Pskent) is a city  in Tashkent Region, Uzbekistan. It is the capital of Piskent District. The town population was 24,405 people in 1989, and 34,900 in 2016.

References

Populated places in Tashkent Region
Cities in Uzbekistan